The Ehrenfest paradox concerns the rotation of a "rigid" disc in the theory of relativity.

In its original 1909 formulation as presented by Paul Ehrenfest in relation to the concept of Born rigidity within special relativity, it discusses an ideally rigid cylinder that is made to rotate about its axis of symmetry. The radius R as seen in the laboratory frame is always perpendicular to its motion and should therefore be equal to its value R0 when stationary. However, the circumference (2R) should appear Lorentz-contracted to a smaller value than at rest, by the usual factor γ. This leads to the contradiction that R = R0 and R < R0.

The paradox has been deepened further by Albert Einstein, who showed that since measuring rods aligned along the periphery and moving with it should appear contracted, more would fit around the circumference, which would thus measure greater than 2R. This indicates that geometry is non-Euclidean for rotating observers, and was important for Einstein's development of general relativity.

Any rigid object made from real materials that is rotating with a transverse velocity close to the speed of sound in the material must exceed the point of rupture due to centrifugal force, because centrifugal pressure can not exceed the shear modulus of material.

 

Therefore, when considering velocities close to the speed of light, it is only a thought experiment. Neutron-degenerate matter may allow velocities close to the speed of light, since the speed of a neutron-star oscillation is relativistic (though these bodies cannot strictly be said to be "rigid").

Essence of the paradox
Imagine a disk of radius R rotating with constant angular velocity .

The reference frame is fixed to the stationary center of the disk.

However, since the radius is perpendicular to the direction of motion, it will not undergo any contraction. So

 

This is paradoxical, since in accordance with Euclidean geometry, it should be exactly equal to .

Ehrenfest's argument
Ehrenfest considered an ideal Born-rigid cylinder that is made to rotate.  Assuming that the cylinder does not expand or contract, its radius stays the same.  But measuring rods laid out along the circumference  should be Lorentz-contracted to a smaller value than at rest, by the usual factor γ. This leads to the paradox that the rigid measuring rods would have to separate from one another due to Lorentz contraction; the discrepancy noted by Ehrenfest seems to suggest that a rotated Born rigid disk should shatter.

Thus Ehrenfest argued by reductio ad absurdum that Born rigidity is not generally compatible with special relativity. According to special relativity an object cannot be spun up from a non-rotating state while maintaining Born rigidity, but once it has achieved a constant nonzero angular velocity it does maintain Born rigidity without violating special relativity, and then (as Einstein later showed) a disk-riding observer will measure a circumference:

Einstein and general relativity 
The rotating disc and its connection with rigidity was also an important thought experiment for Albert Einstein in developing general relativity. He referred to it in several publications in 1912, 1916, 1917, 1922 and drew the insight from it, that the geometry of the disc becomes non-Euclidean for a co-rotating observer. Einstein wrote (1922): 66ff: Imagine a circle drawn about the origin in the x'y' plane of K' and a diameter of this circle. Imagine, further, that we have given a large number of rigid rods, all equal to each other. We suppose these laid in series along the periphery and the diameter of the circle, at rest relatively to K'. If U is the number of these rods along the periphery, D the number along the diameter, then, if K' does not rotate relatively to K, we shall have . But if K' rotates we get a different result. Suppose that at a definite time t of K we determine the ends of all the rods. With respect to K all the rods upon the periphery experience the Lorentz contraction, but the rods upon the diameter do not experience this contraction (along their lengths!). It therefore follows that .  It therefore follows that the laws of configuration of rigid bodies with respect to K' do not agree with the laws of configuration of rigid bodies that are in accordance with Euclidean geometry. If, further, we place two similar clocks (rotating with K'), one upon the periphery, and the other at the centre of the circle, then, judged from K, the clock on the periphery will go slower than the clock at the centre. The same thing must take place, judged from K' if we define time with respect to K' in a not wholly unnatural way, that is, in such a way that the laws with respect to K' depend explicitly upon the time. Space and time, therefore, cannot be defined with respect to K' as they were in the special theory of relativity with respect to inertial systems. But, according to the principle of equivalence, K' is also to be considered as a system at rest, with respect to which there is a gravitational field (field of centrifugal force, and force of Coriolis). We therefore arrive at the result: the gravitational field influences and even determines the metrical laws of the space-time continuum. If the laws of configuration of ideal rigid bodies are to be expressed geometrically, then in the presence of a gravitational field the geometry is not Euclidean.

Brief history 
Citations to the papers mentioned below (and many which are not) can be found in a paper by Øyvind Grøn which is available on-line.

 1909: Max Born introduces a notion of rigid motion in special relativity.
 1909: After studying Born's notion of rigidity, Paul Ehrenfest demonstrated by means of a paradox about a cylinder that goes from rest to rotation, that most motions of extended bodies cannot be Born rigid.
 1910: Gustav Herglotz and Fritz Noether independently elaborated on Born's model and showed (Herglotz–Noether theorem) that Born rigidity only allows three degrees of freedom for bodies in motion. For instance, it's possible that a rigid body is executing uniform rotation, yet accelerated rotation is impossible. So a Born rigid body cannot be brought from a state of rest into rotation, confirming Ehrenfest's result.
 1910: Max Planck calls attention to the fact that one should not confuse the problem of the contraction of a disc due to spinning it up, with that of what disk-riding observers will measure as compared to stationary observers. He suggests that resolving the first problem will require introducing some material model and employing the theory of elasticity.
 1910: Theodor Kaluza points out that there is nothing inherently paradoxical about the static and disk-riding observers obtaining different results for the circumference. This does however imply, Kaluza argues, that "the geometry of the rotating disk" is non-euclidean.  He asserts without proof that this geometry is in fact essentially just the geometry of the hyperbolic plane.
 1911: Max von Laue shows, that an accelerated body has an infinite number of degrees of freedom, thus no rigid bodies can exist in special relativity.
 1916: While writing up his new general theory of relativity, Albert Einstein notices that disk-riding observers measure a longer circumference,  = 2πr/.  That is, because rulers moving parallel to their length axis appear shorter as measured by static observers, the disk-riding observers can fit more smaller rulers of a given length around the circumference than stationary observers could.
 1922: In his seminal book "The Mathematical Theory of Relativity" (p. 113), A.S.Eddington calculates a contraction of the radius of the rotating disc (compared to stationary scales) of one quarter of the 'Lorentz contraction' factor applied to the circumference.
 1935: Paul Langevin essentially introduces a moving frame (or frame field in modern language) corresponding to the family of disk-riding observers, now called Langevin observers.  (See the figure.) He also shows that distances measured by nearby Langevin observers correspond to a certain Riemannian metric, now called the Langevin-Landau-Lifschitz metric.
 1937: Jan Weyssenhoff (now perhaps best known for his work on Cartan connections with zero curvature and nonzero torsion) notices that the Langevin observers are not hypersurface orthogonal.  Therefore, the Langevin-Landau-Lifschitz metric is defined, not on some hyperslice of Minkowski spacetime, but on the quotient space obtained by replacing each world line with a point.  This gives a three-dimensional smooth manifold which becomes a Riemannian manifold when we add the metric structure.
 1946: Nathan Rosen shows that inertial observers instantaneously comoving with Langevin observers also measure small distances given by Langevin-Landau-Lifschitz metric.
 1946: E. L. Hill analyzes relativistic stresses in a material in which (roughly speaking) the speed of sound equals the speed of light and shows these just cancel the radial expansion due to centrifugal force (in any physically realistic material, the relativistic effects lessen but do not cancel the radial expansion).  Hill explains errors in earlier analyses by Arthur Eddington and others.
 1952: C. Møller attempts to study null geodesics from the point of view of rotating observers (but incorrectly tries to use slices rather than the appropriate quotient space)
 1968: V. Cantoni provides a straightforward, purely kinematical explanation of the paradox by showing that "one of the assumptions implicitly contained in the statement of Ehrenfest's paradox is not correct, the assumption being that the geometry of Minkowski space-time allows the passage of the disk from rest to rotation in such a fashion that both the length of the radius and the length of the periphery, measured with respect to the comoving frame of reference, remain unchanged"
 1975: Øyvind Grøn writes a classic review paper about solutions of the "paradox".
 1977: Grünbaum and Janis introduce a notion of physically realizable "non-rigidity" which can be applied to the spin-up of an initially non-rotating disk (this notion is not physically realistic for real materials from which one might make a disk, but it is useful for thought experiments).
 1981: Grøn notices that Hooke's law is not consistent with Lorentz transformations and introduces a relativistic generalization.
 1997: T. A. Weber explicitly introduces the frame field associated with Langevin observers.
 2000: Hrvoje Nikolić points out that the paradox disappears when (in accordance with general theory of relativity) each piece of the rotating disk is treated separately, as living in its own local non-inertial frame.
 2002: Rizzi and Ruggiero (and Bel) explicitly introduce the quotient manifold mentioned above.

Resolution of the paradox 
Grøn states that the resolution of the paradox stems from the impossibility of synchronizing clocks in a rotating reference frame. If observers on the rotating circumference try to synchronise their clocks around the circumference to establish disc time, there is a time difference between the two end points where they meet.

The modern resolution can be briefly summarized as follows:
Small distances measured by disk-riding observers are described by the Langevin-Landau-Lifschitz metric, which is indeed well approximated (for small angular velocity) by the geometry of the hyperbolic plane, just as Kaluza had claimed.
For physically reasonable materials, during the spin-up phase a real disk expands radially due to centrifugal forces; relativistic corrections partially counteract (but do not cancel) this Newtonian effect.  After a steady-state rotation is achieved and the disk has been allowed to relax, the geometry "in the small" is approximately given by the Langevin–Landau–Lifschitz metric.

See also 
 Born coordinates, for a coordinate chart adapted to observers riding on a rigidly rotating disk
 Length contraction
 Relativistic disk

Some other "paradoxes" in special relativity

 Bell's spaceship paradox
 Ladder paradox
 Physical paradox
 Supplee's paradox
 Twin paradox

Notes

Citations

Works cited

A few papers of historical interest

A few classic "modern" references

  See Section 84 and the problem at the end of Section 89.

Some experimental work and subsequent discussion

Selected recent sources

 Studies general non-inertial motion of a point particle and treats rotating disk as a collection of such non-inertial particles.  See also the eprint version.
 Studies a coordinate chart constructed using radar distance "in the large" from a single Langevin observer.  See also the eprint version.
 They give a precise definition of the "space of the disk" (non-Euclidean), and solve the paradox without extraneous dynamic considerations. See also the eprint version.
   This book contains a comprehensive historical survey by Øyvind Grøn, on which the "brief history" in this article is based, and some other papers on the Ehrenfest paradox and related controversies.  Hundreds of additional references may be found in this book, particularly the paper by Grøn.

External links

 The Rigid Rotating Disk in Relativity, by Michael Weiss (1995), from the sci.physics FAQ.
 Einstein's Carousel (section 3.4.4), by B. Crowell

Relativistic paradoxes
Theory of relativity